The 1928 All-Southwest Conference football team consists of American football players chosen by various sports writers and officials for All-Southwest Conference teams for the 1928 college football season.

All Southwest selections

Quarterbacks
 Redman Hume, SMU (Hop; NR-1; FH-2; GW-1)
 Howard Grubbs, TCU (Legg-1; Em-2; NR-2; FH-1; PC)
 Jake Wilson, Baylor (Legg-2; Em-1; LG-1; PC [HB])
 Rees, Texas (FM)

Halfbacks
 Ross Love, Sr., SMU (Hop; Legg-1; NR-1; FH-1; GW-1; PC)
 Virgil Gilliland, Baylor (Hop; Legg-1; Em-2; FH-2; GW-1)
 Dexter Shelley, Texas (Em-1; FM [FB]; NR-2; LG-1)
 Hughes, Texas (Em-2; NR-2; FH-1; LG-1)
 Hume, SMU (Em-1; FM)
 Perkins, Texas (Legg-2; NR-1; FH-2)
 Hertin (Legg-2)

Fullbacks
 Garland 'Bevo' Beavers, Arkansas (Em-1; FM [HB]; NR-1; FH-1; GW-1; PC)
 King, Texas (Hop; Legg-2; FH-2)
 Herschel Burgess, Texas A&M (Legg-1)
 Love, SMU (Em-2; LG-1)
 Griffith (NR-2)

Ends
 Bill Ford, Texas (Legg-1; Em-1; FM; NR-1; FH-1; LG-1; GW-1; PC)
 Petty, Texas A&M (Em-1; FM; NR-1; FH-1; LG-1; GW-1; PC)
 Wear Schoonover, Arkansas (Legg-1; Em-2; FH-2)
 Rhoads, Texas (Hop; Legg-2)
 Shaerdel, SMU (Hop)
 Trigg (Legg-2; Em-2; NR-2; FH-2)
 Lucas (NR-2)

Tackles
 Brown, Texas (Hop; Legg-1; Em-1; FM; NR-2; FH-1; LG-1; GW-1; PC)
 Williams, TCU (Hop; Legg-1; Em-1; NR-1; FH-1; LG-1; GW-1; PC)
 Griffin, Baylor (FM; NR-1; FH-2)
 Moore (Legg-2)
 Winters (Legg-2; NR-2)
 Bartlett (Em-2)
 Knippel, Rice (FH-2)

Guards
 Choc Sanders, SMU (Hop; Legg-1; Em-1; NR-1; FH-2; LG-1; GW-1; PC)
 Clyde Van Sickle, Arkansas (Legg-1; Em-2 [T]; NR-2; FH-1; LG-1; GW-1; PC)
 Mike Brumbelow, TCU (Hop; Em-2; NR-1; FH-2)
 Barton Koch, Baylor (Legg-2; Em-1; NR-2; FH-1)
 Richter, Texas A&M (FM)
 Creighton, Arkansas (FM)
 Phillips (Legg-2)
 Jones (Em-2)

Centers
 Z. W. Bartlett, Texas A&M (NR-2; FH-1; LG-1; GW-1; PC)
 Powell, SMU (Hop; Legg-1; Em-2)
 Adkins, TCU (Em-1; NR-1; FH-2)
 Wray, Texas (FM)
 Burnett (Legg-2)

Key
Hop = A. S. "Hop" Hopkins, sports editor Austin American

Legg = Don Legg, sports editor Austin Statesman

Em = Victor Emanuel, sports editor Galveston News

FM = Fred Mosebach, sports editor San Antonio Express

NR = Ned Record, sports editor Fort Worth Record-Telegram

FH = Flem Hall, sports editor Fort Worth Star-Telegram

LG = Lloyd Gregory, sports editor Houston Post-Dispatch

GW = George White, sports editor Dallas News

PC = Pete Cawthorn, Southwest Conference official

See also
 1928 College Football All-America Team

References

All-Southwest Conference
All-Southwest Conference football teams